KBYN: Kaagapay ng Bayan (also known as KBYN) is a Philippine television documentary and news magazine show produced by ABS-CBN News and Current Affairs broadcast by Kapamilya Channel and is simulcasted on A2Z and TeleRadyo. Hosted by Noli de Castro, it premiered on April 10, 2022 on the network's Yes Weekend Sunday afternoon line-up.

History
KBYN: Kaagapay ng Bayan premiered on April 10, 2022. The program serves as de Castro's comeback on television after withdrawing his bid for the 2022 Senate elections and returning to his home network ABS-CBN, and his return to the news magazine format since he left Magandang Gabi, Bayan in 2004.

On January 1, 2023, the show aired its final episode due to de Castro returning to TV Patrol for the third time 8 days after. Re-runs of past episodes started to air on January 8. New stories from KBYN are highlighted regularly on TV Patrol in a segment called KBYN Special Report, similar to Kabayan Special Patrol, a segment previously hosted by de Castro.

Host

Noli de Castro

See also
Magandang Gabi... Bayan
Kabayan

References

Notes

Philippine television shows
2022 Philippine television series debuts
2023 Philippine television series endings
ABS-CBN original programming
ABS-CBN News and Current Affairs shows
Filipino-language television shows